Brian Allison (born 23 June 1988) in Edinburgh is a Scottish football defender, who plays for Stirling Albion.

Football career

Allison made his début for Falkirk on 29 September 2007 against Inverness Caledonian Thistle. Allison made another appearance for the SPL outfit before going on loan to First Division side Stirling Albion in the January 2008 transfer window. Allison was initially placed on a one-month loan deal, with the possibility to extend until the end of the season. Alison made his début for Stirling Albion against St Johnstone on 26 January 2008. Allison scored his first professional career goal in Stirling Albion's match against Partick Thistle on 9 February 2008. A second loan spell with Stirling followed in 2010, before he joined them on a permanent basis after his release from Falkirk at the end of the 2009-10 season.

His second goal made headline news across Scotland, as it was scored in a 1–0 win against Rangers on 6 October 2012. Stirling Albion became the first Third Division club to beat Rangers since they were admitted to play in Scotland's lowest league. The result was even more remarkable as the Stirling Albion manager was absent, getting married. After the match, British based gambling company Ladbrokes revealed Allison's goal against Rangers saved the bookies about £5 million

References

External links 

1988 births
Living people
Footballers from Edinburgh
Scottish footballers
Association football defenders
Falkirk F.C. players
Stirling Albion F.C. players
Scottish Premier League players
Scottish Football League players